Wyvern, also known as Dragon, is a 2009 Canadian-American made-for-television horror film produced by RHI Entertainment that premiered in the United States on the Syfy Channel on January 31, 2009. Written by Jason Bourque and directed by Steven R. Monroe, the film is the 15th of the Maneater Series produced under an agreement with Sci Fi Pictures. The film stars Nick Chinlund as Jake Suttner, a trucker who must stop a wyvern from eating the residents in the small town of Beaver Mills, Alaska. In Japan, it is titled Jurassic Predator.

Plot

The small Alaskan town of Beaver Mills is located just north of the Arctic Circle, meaning that the sun does not set during the summer solstice. As the town prepares for its annual celebration of this event, a wyvern, a fierce winged beast similar in appearance to a dragon, is released by the melting of the ice caps. A fisherman alone on the shore of a lake nearby, cuts himself while cleaning a fish, casually washes his injury over the water, and as the blood hits the lake the wyvern attacks.

Meanwhile, in town, ice trucker Jake Suttner, acts as a handyman, fixing the steps of the town cafe and gathering place. Jake had an accident with his truck nearby a few months prior, in which his brother was killed. Jake had relatively minor injuries, and he's waiting in Beaver Mills for his insurance claim to be settled. Owner and waitress at the restaurant, Claire, is clearly attracted to Jake, which town doctor, David, notices because he's attracted to Claire. David doesn't understand, doctor or not, Claire has no romantic interest in him.

In the restaurant we also meet Edna and Farley. Edna is an older woman mourning the loss of her best friend, Maggie, who died about a year ago, and this takes the form of denial; Edna behaves as if Maggie is still alive and interacts with her. Claire, Farley and the others in town humor her, and in fact when Claire clears away Edna and Maggie's breakfast plates, which she insists are on the house, she walks the plates right over to Farley for him to have Maggie's obviously uneaten food, you get the impression this is their daily routine. Farley is just a guy in town, no explanation really of who he is and what he does; he seems to be the town's buffoon.

After Jake goes to an RV he's using as a temporary home, he finds David there waiting for him, under the pretext of treating Jake's hand injury, but in reality he wants to gauge Jake's interest in Claire, saying after Jake leaves, he –David- will still be there. Jake says he looks at Claire only because she's an attractive woman, leaving David believing Jake isn't a threat. Unfortunately while en route to another house call after leaving Jake, David stops to answer nature's call, and the wyvern attacks, pulling him out of his vehicle.

The next morning, Sheriff Dawson and Jake are having a conversation at about 5AM outside Claire's restaurant, waiting for her to open, and hear gunshots. They decide to investigate and find Haas, an older man described affectionately as a ‘hillbilly’ by Claire, talking wildly about being attacked by the wyvern. They don't believe him at first, thinking he's just going on too little sleep, but Jake sees a bloody arm lying nearby and identifies it as David's. The three men head back to town, and Dawson calls ahead to Claire while they drive to ask her to have the townspeople gather, telling her only that David is missing and may have been injured. He asks Deputy Susie to go out to the arm's location to investigate. After they arrive in town, they explain Doc is missing and things don't look good for him.  While he's talking, Susie comes in, holding the arm, which horrifies Claire and the others present, Dawson reprimands her, telling her to put it in the cooler at their office. Dawson advises them all to be careful, they obviously have a predator loose in the area, but then has to leave to investigate another incident.

While this happens, the Colonel, an older military man, has had a couple of odd things happen at home, like his dog disappearing and a moose's head being dropped into his hot tub. He sees the wyvern at home and again while going to town to warn the citizens; but they don't believe him.  He asks Vinyl Hampton, who runs the town's radio station, to broadcast an emergency warning, but she refuses, saying she cannot as she answers to a higher authority. The Colonel leaves in a huff.

Dawson has told Deputy Susie to keep an eye on town, so she's there watching the goings on at the solstice festival. He gets to the location he was called to, finds the owner and some animals dead in a barn, but slips on the blood as he turns to leave and hits his head, knocking him unconscious.  In town, Vinyl sees the wyvern from her window, and tries to make an emergency broadcast, but is stopped when the creature rips out her antenna.

Sheriff Dawson comes to and calls Susie, tells her to stop the festival, get everyone home.  She starts making this announcement to the small crowd using a megaphone, and is puzzled when they all look at her with some confusion. She doesn't see the wyvern flying up behind her, and it savagely takes her life, the megaphone falling to the ground in a puddle of blood.  Several others ae killed, while some, like Haas, Vinyl, Farley, and Edna take refuge in the café.

While all this is going on in town, Jake and Claire have tracked the wyvern to a strange mound  in the forest, and run into the Colonel after, who has discovered the interstate which brings people in and out of town is full of cars, trucks, and RV's, crashed and attacked by the wyvern, intent on keeping the town secluded. They decide to go back to Beaver Mills, and don't see a badly wounded David on the far side of what is truly a nest, as he is able to look in and see three large, odd, dark orange eggs. Just then the wyvern flies overhead and envelopes the doctor.

Back in Beaver Mills, Sheriff Dawson arrives to see the megaphone and blood that was his deputy in the road, and is then killed by the wyvern as those in the café yell warnings to him. When Claire, Jake, and the Colonel arrive, and everyone takes stock, some go elsewhere in town to get supplies, and while going back to the  café Farley is scraped across his chest with the beast's tail, causing a bloody injury, and is helped into the building.  Jake and Claire talk while everyone's trying to rest, and he tells her he believes it was his fault his brother died in the accident. He says that his brother was sick and so all the driving for a few days was on Jake, rather than resting or turning back, he insisted on continuing, even though they really didn't need the money.

The wyvern brings David, still alive, and drops him in the middle of town as bait to draw people out of the cafe. David screams for help, bloody and in pain.  Jake goes to rescue him, and Farley distracts the wyvern to save the two men, but is killed himself. David tells the group the wyvern has eggs, then dies right after of his injuries. Claire, Jake, Haas, Vinyl, and the Colonel decide to electrify the nest with some of the items the beast has used to construct it and kill the wyvern. They do succeed somewhat, but the creature kills Haas and escapes after it is shocked and flies off. The Colonel immediately starts shooting the eggs, but Jakes stops him, says they could be bait.

The survivors drive away, but stop when they see what looks like brand new truck tractor on the side of the road, Jake's claim fulfilled. Jake comes up with a plan to kill the wyvern, saying he needs Doc's GPS and the egg strapped into the truck. He drives off, alone, and as the GPS tells him he's getting closer to ‘his destination’ the wyvern appears and attacks the vehicle. As the truck reaches its destination the wyvern is on the front, covering the hood, and Jake bails out as the tractor sails off a cliff, and explodes.
  
Everyone is waiting for Jake to appear at Claire's café, as the sky gets slightly darker. He soon does, sauntering around a corner towards the restaurant, Claire joyfully hugs him, and he hugs her right back. The others are happy to see him, but ask about his rig. He says he doesn't need it, he likes it right there, glancing at Claire.

Cast
 Nick Chinlund as Jake Suttner
 Erin Karpluk as Claire
 Barry Corbin as Hass
 Tinsel Korey as "Vinyl" Hampton
 Simon Longmore as Farley
 John Shaw as Chief Dawson
 Elaine Miles as Deputy Susie Barnes
 Don S. Davis as Colonel Travis Sherman
 Karen Austin as Edna Grunyon
 David Lewis as Dr. David Yates
 Dave Ward as Fisherman

References

External links
 
 
 Dread central review

2000s science fiction horror films
2009 films
2009 horror films
2009 television films
English-language Canadian films
Canadian science fiction horror films
CineTel Films films
2000s English-language films
Films about dragons
Films directed by Steven R. Monroe
Films scored by Pinar Toprak
Maneater (film series)
Canadian natural horror films
American natural horror films
Giant monster films
2000s monster movies
American monster movies
American science fiction horror films
Syfy original films
Films set in Alaska
2000s American films
2000s Canadian films